is a Japanese manga series written and illustrated by Yukizō Saku. It was adapted into a Japanese television drama series.

Media

Manga
Written and illustrated by Yukizō Saku, Hakuba no Ōji-sama was serialized in Shogakukan's seinen manga magazine Weekly Big Comic Spirits from April 25, 2005, to May 26, 2008. Shogakukan collected is chapters in ten tankōbon volumes, released from August 30, 2005, to June 30, 2008.

Drama

Cast
Yūka as Takako Hara
Takahiro Miura as Kōtarō Ozu
Shunsuke Nakamura as Akio Kurosawa
Hirofumi Arai as Nobuo Egawa
Mayuko Kawakita as Kaori Higashiyama
Mio Yūki as Kotomi Ichikawa

References

External links
Hakuba no Ōji-sama Junai Tekireiki on Yomiuri TV 

Shogakukan manga
Seinen manga
Romance anime and manga
Nippon TV original programming
2013 Japanese television series debuts
Yomiuri Telecasting Corporation original programming